City of London Academy Islington (COLAI, formerly Islington Green School) is an 11–18 mixed, secondary school and sixth form with academy status in Islington, Greater London, England. It was established in 1966 and adopted its present name after becoming an academy in September 2008.

Its sixth form opened in September 2010 and is jointly sponsored by the City of London Corporation and City, University of London.

History

Islington Green School 

Islington Green School (IGS) was established in 1966 and was an 11–16 mixed community secondary school.

The school failed its Ofsted inspection in 1997. The school had received a 38 percent pass rate the previous year and despite shortcomings, the staff were convinced that the school was not failing. The decision caused the school to "implode". The headteacher, under enormous pressure to make visible changes discarded mixed-ability teaching, many teachers decided to leave, and the pass rate dropped below 25 percent. The school went through nine inspections before it finally came out of special measures in 2000 and serious weaknesses in 2003.

Ken Muller, a teacher at the school and SWP activist, made a request to Ofsted under the new Freedom of Information Act to see the documents relating to the judgment. Twenty working days later, he got a reply. Most of the documents had been destroyed, said the email, but there was one that might be of interest. Attached was a memo dated November 1997, from HMI Barry Jones to the then chief inspector Chris Woodhead, making clear that the HMI team, of which Jones was a member, had disagreed with Ofsted's judgment, and noting that they were "of the unanimous view that the school was not failing".

Peter Hyman, former speech writer for Tony Blair, decided to leave politics and teach at Islington Green School. He wrote a book of his experiences, 1 Out Of 10: From Downing Street Vision To Classroom Reality.

Cultural references
Students from the school were featured on Pink Floyd's 1979 album The Wall in the song "Another Brick in the Wall (Part II)".

The school was used as a location to film the BBC drama That Summer Day, a fictional account of the effect the bombings of the London public transport system on 7 July 2005 had on six children. Some of the school's younger students were used as extras in the film.

Notable alumni 

Islington Green School
 Thomas Cruise, professional footballer
 Esther Farinde, singer and songwriter
 Paloma Faith, singer, songwriter and actress
 Billy Godleman, cricketer
 Joe Wright, film director

Notable staff 
Islington Green School
 Margaret Maden, headteacher from 1975 to 1983

References

External links 
 

Secondary schools in the London Borough of Islington
Academies in the London Borough of Islington
Educational institutions established in 1966
1966 establishments in England